Blooming Grove is a town in western Navarro County, Texas, United States. As of the 2010 census, the town population was 821.

Geography

Blooming Grove is located at  (32.092084, –96.717088).

According to History of Navarro County, Blooming Grove was a combination of Dr. James Davis' son's name, Blooming Davis, and a grove of trees near Gradyville, the previous name. The name change was just after the Civil War.

Demographics

At the 2000 census there were 833 people, 342 households, and 233 families in the town. The population density was 975.1 people per square mile (378.4/km). There were 373 housing units at an average density of 436.6 per square mile (169.4/km).  The racial makeup of the town was 91.24% White, 5.28% African American, 0.36% Native American, 1.32% from other races, and 1.80% from two or more races. Hispanic or Latino of any race were 4.32%.

Of the 342 households 31.9% had children under the age of 18 living with them, 54.1% were married couples living together, 11.1% had a female householder with no husband present, and 31.6% were non-families. 29.2% of households were one person and 16.1% were one person aged 65 or older. The average household size was 2.44 and the average family size was 3.00.

The age distribution was 26.4% under the age of 18, 5.6% from 18 to 24, 29.8% from 25 to 44, 18.6% from 45 to 64, and 19.6% 65 or older. The median age was 38 years. For every 100 females, there were 83.1 males. For every 100 females age 18 and over, there were 81.4 males.

The median household income was $32,375 and the median family income  was $46,364. Males had a median income of $35,000 versus $22,059 for females. The per capita income for the town was $17,747. About 12.7% of families and 17.7% of the population were below the poverty line, including 17.6% of those under age 18 and 16.7% of those age 65 or over.

Education

The Town of Blooming Grove is served by the Blooming Grove Independent School District and home to the Blooming Grove High School Lions.

See also

 List of towns in Texas

References

External links

Towns in Navarro County, Texas
Towns in Texas